The 1972 Nebraska United States Senate  election was held on November 7, 1972 to select the U.S. Senator from the state of Nebraska. Republican U.S. Senator Carl Curtis won re-election.

Candidates

Democratic
 Terry Carpenter, former congressman
 John DeCamp, State Senator

Republican
 Carl Curtis, Incumbent U.S. Senator

Results

References 

Nebraska
1972
1972 Nebraska elections